Rhodocyphella is a genus of cyphelloid fungi in the family Tricholomataceae.  The Global Biodiversity Information Facility gives it as having two species, R. cupuliformis and R. grisea.

The well-established species Rhodocyphella cupuliformis (Berkeley & Ravenel) W.B. Cooke (1961) grows on Juniper trunks.  The type specimen was found in McIntosh County, Georgia and it has also been found in New Zealand.

R. grisea is the same as Cyphella grisea Petch (1922), which was found on tree bark in Sri Lanka.  It is not recognized as a current species name in Species Fungorum.

The paper by Bodensteiner et al. indicates that Rhodocyphella is closely linked to Resupinatus and Stigmatolemma.  But the latter genus is already merged with Resupinatus according to Index Fungorum, and it seems likely that Rhodocyphella should also be merged into the same taxon.

Rhodocyphella is not to be confused with Rhodocybella, which is also a small genus of cyphelloid fungi growing on bark, but which belongs to family Entolomataceae.

References

Tricholomataceae